Ron Bailey (1914–1989) was an Australian rugby league footballer who played in the 1930s, and 1940s. He was a New South Wales Country, New South Wales and Australian representative whose club career was played with Waratah Mayfield, Newtown, Canterbury-Bankstown in Sydney and overseas with Huddersfield. He captained his country in one Test in 1946 and was the first Canterbury-Bankstown player to do so.

Club career
Bailey was graded with the Waratah Mayfield club at age 18. After that, he went on to represent the Country New South Wales rugby league team in 1935-36. In 1936 he came to the attention of Sydney talent scouts when he represented for Newcastle against a touring English side, downing the visitors 21-6.

Bailey came to Sydney for Newtown in 1937 and playing at  alongside Frank Hyde helped Newtown to win the City Cup that year.

Canterbury won a premiership under Bailey in 1942 when they won the grand final, 11-9.

Representative career
After the war Bailey made his state and national representative debuts. He played five games for New South Wales against Queensland, and visiting English sides. He played two games for Australia against Great Britain in 1946, the second of those as captain.

With no international fixtures scheduled in 1947 Bailey had played his last Test in 1946. He played out the 1947-48 seasons as captain-coach with West Maitland before his retirement.

References

Sources
 Whiticker, Alan (2004) Captaining the Kangaroos, New Holland, Sydney

External links
Bulldogs profile
 No More Bloody Bundles For Britain

1914 births
1989 deaths
Australia national rugby league team captains
Australia national rugby league team players
Australian rugby league players
Canterbury-Bankstown Bulldogs coaches
Canterbury-Bankstown Bulldogs players
Huddersfield Giants players
Newcastle rugby league team players
Newtown Jets players
Rugby league centres
Rugby league players from Newcastle, New South Wales
Waratah Mayfield Cheetahs players